is a Japanese actress. She has played Sunmi in Tokyo Tribe, Tetsuko Kuroyanagi in the TV Asahi adaptation of Kuroyanagi's autobiography Totto-Chan: The Little Girl at the Window, and Yuko Komiya in the 98th NHK asadora Half Blue Sky, among numerous other TV and film roles.

Early life and education
Seino was born on October 14, 1994 in Inazawa, Aichi, Japan. She started her entertainment career in 2007 as an exclusive model for the girls' fashion magazine Pichilemon. At the age of 15 Seino moved from Aichi to Tokyo alone, later graduating from Japan Arts High School.
When she saw Resident Evil, she admired Milla Jovovich, and soon became a pupil of Tak Sakaguchi, who is an action choreographer and actor.

Career
Seino made her television acting debut in 2011 as Momoka Kurakano in the Tokyo Broadcasting System Television adaptation of Bisco Hatori's manga series Ouran High School Host Club. After minor roles in two films, she successfully auditioned for the role of Sunmi in the 2014 Sono Sion action film Tokyo Tribe, a "hip-hop musical" about warring Tokyo gangs, adapted from Santa Inoue's manga series. While Variety'''s Dennis Harvey described Sunmi as "a secretive stranger" who becomes "an unstoppable killing machine when ill treated," Martin Tsai of the Los Angeles Times suggested that Sunmi's only reason to be in the movie was "to flash her undergarment every time she does a roundhouse kick that inadvertently lifts up her skirt." A second supporting action role, as Mari in the Shusuke Kaneko film Danger Dolls, followed. At the 36th Yokohama Film Festival Seino won a Best Newcomer award for her work in Tokyo Tribe and Danger Dolls. Later in 2014 Seino turned 20 years old while playing the supporting role of Kanna Seki in the Fuji TV drama .

The next year Seino played the lead role of Ai in Mamoru Oshii's bullying revenge film , as well as supporting roles in the TV Tokyo drama , the TBS adaptation of the manga series Kōnodori, the TBS police drama Ouroboros, and the Yoshihiro Nishimura historical film . In 2016 she played the lead role in the short 4DX horror film  and the supporting role of Jaku in Kankurō Kudō's afterlife comedy .

Seino landed her first lead role in a television series as Tetsuko Kuroyanagi in Totto-Chan!, the 2017 TV Asahi adaptation of Kuroyanagi's autobiographical memoir Totto-Chan: The Little Girl at the Window. That same year she starred in the film  as Mitsu, a mentally ill prostitute who falls in love with a man who has cerebral palsy. In 2018 Seino appeared as Yuko Komiya in several episodes of the 98th NHK asadora Half Blue Sky, and as Riko Akasaka in NTV's adaptation of the Hiroyuki Nishimori manga series Kyō Kara Ore Wa!!Personal life
Seino married actor Toma Ikuta on June 1, 2020. On March 9, 2022, she announced that she gave birth to her first child.

 Filmography 
 Film 

 Television 

 Web series 
 Happy Marriage!?'' (2016, Japan) – Chiwa Takanashi

Awards

References

External links
 Official profile 
 

21st-century Japanese actresses
1994 births
Living people
Actors from Aichi Prefecture
People from Inazawa